Joe Junior (born Jose Maria Rodrigues Jr.) is a Hong Kong English pop singer from Macau who as active during the 1960s. He has since been in a number of TVB drama series in the 1990s and 2000s playing older character roles. He has regularly appeared on TV music programs as a host and performer.  Some of his notable singles are: Here's a Heart, Deborah, Voice of Love, The End, and I Got To Find a Cupid.

Rodrigues' family is from Macau and is of Macanese (mixed Chinese and Portuguese) ancestry.

Filmography

Security Unlimited (1981)
Cageman (1992)
 SDU'97 "特種飛虎" (1997)
The Duke of Mount Deer (1998)
Bishonen (1998)
Feminine Masculinity (1999)
War of the Genders (2000)
Gods of Honour (2001)
Troublesome Night 14 (2002)
The 'W' Files (2003)
Ups and Downs in the Sea of Love (2003)
The Conqueror's Story (2004)
D.I.E. (2008)
No Regrets (2010)
Ghetto Justice (2011)
When Heaven Burns (2011-2012)
L'Escargot (2012)
Master of Play (2012)
Bullet Brain (2013)
A Change of Heart (2013)
Awfully Lawful (2013)
Sniper Standoff (2013)
Return of the Silver Tongue (2013-2014)
Line Walker (2014)  
All That Is Bitter Is Sweet (2014)
Noblesse Oblige (2014-2015)
Smooth Talker (2015)
Ghost of Relativity (2015)
Every Step You Take (2015)
Speed of Life (2016)
Buddy Cops (2016)

References

External links
 

Hong Kong male singers
Hong Kong people of Portuguese descent
TVB actors
English-language singers from Hong Kong
English-language singers from Macau
1947 births
Living people
20th-century Hong Kong male actors
21st-century Hong Kong male actors
Hong Kong male film actors
Hong Kong male television actors
Macanese film actors